Francis W. Parker School is an independent school serving students who live in the Chicago area from Pre-K  through twelfth grade. Located in Chicago's Lincoln Park neighborhood, the school is based on the progressive education philosophies of John Dewey and Colonel Francis Wayland Parker, emphasizing community and citizenship. Tuition and fees range from $36,480 for kindergarten to $42,300 for grade 12.

History
In 1899, Anita McCormick Blaine, interested in the unconventional education philosophy of Francis Wayland Parker, convinced him to establish an independent school in Chicago's North Side with her financial backing. 

Founded in 1901, Parker boasts the first official parents' association as well as one of the first school newspapers to be  written, typeset, and printed by students: The Parker Weekly, which began publishing in 1911.

Parker has 946 students, and has undergone considerable physical renovation between 2000 and 2009. Parker added an AstroTurf field which started construction in June 2012, and it was finished in September 2012. During the 2008–09 school year, the Auditorium was completely renovated, with new classrooms, more seating, office space and a balcony. In the 2016–17 school year, renovation began for the new Kovler family library. The new library will include a balcony, reading nooks, a Lego table, and movable bookshelves.

Parker school formerly published Schools: Studies in Education, a national education journal featuring the narrative and analytic reflections of educators and students nationwide. The school is a member of the Chicago Independent School League (ISL).

Many notable figures have spoken at Parker during the school's tri-weekly assemblies known as "Morning Exercise," including Barack Obama, Albert Einstein, Jane Addams, and John Lewis. In addition, the Chicago Humanities Festival frequently utilizes Parker's auditorium for guest speakers. Doris Kearns Goodwin, Camille Paglia, and Ta-Nehisi Coates have all spoken at Parker's Heller Auditorium for the festival.

Student activities

Athletics 
Parker is part of the Independent School League (ISL) athletic conference, and its team name is the Colonel named after the school's founder, Colonel Francis Wayland Parker. In addition to Parker's colonel mascot, a new eagle mascot nicknamed "the Eagle" was introduced as an additional mascot as a way to better connect with younger students.

Robotics 
The Francis W. Parker Robotics Program, founded in the fall of 2002 has competed in the FIRST Robotics Competition (FRC), FIRST Tech Challenge (FTC), FIRST Lego League (FLL), and MATE ROV Competition allowing students grades 6th through 12th to be on the teams. The program's FTC team 3507 Robotheosis has won the Illinois State Championship twice (2019, 2020), the team has won the Chicago League Inspire Award (the highest award given at each tournament) three times (2017, 2018, 2019), and the Chicago League Championship twice (2014, 2018). The team also runs the Chicago Robotics Invitational, a summer invitational off-season tournament in mid-July that sees 34 teams from around the country come to the school to compete in a modified version of that seasons FTC Game.

Notable alumni

Paul Adelstein, actor
Jonathan Alter, liberal  journalist, critic, author, and editor for Newsweek.
Jennifer Beals, actress (Flashdance, Devil in a Blue Dress, The L Word).
Margaret Bonds, composer, pianist, and activist. 
Sir Henry Channon, Member of Parliament (U.K.), diarist.
Carl Diehl, All-American college football player at Dartmouth
Bobby Florsheim, screenwriter
Eric Forsberg, filmmaker
Chuck Gelatka, football player
Edward Gorey, writer and illustrator
Justin Hall, pioneer blogger
Daryl Hannah, actress (Blade Runner, Splash, Kill Bill).
Sarah Haskins, comedian
Anne Heche, actress (Donnie Brasco, Psycho, Six Days Seven Nights).
Katharine Holabird, author
Celeste Holm, Oscar-winning actress
Arnold Horween, Harvard Crimson and NFL football player
Ralph Horween, Harvard Crimson and NFL football player
Peter Jacobson, actor
Ian Keith (1899–1960), actor of theater and film who worked opposite John Wayne in The Big Trail and with directors D.W. Griffith and Cecil B. DeMille.
Eric Klinenberg, sociologist and author
Karyn Kupcinet, actress
Amy Landecker, actress
Kate Levant, artist

Eugene Lipov, physician and medical researcher
Kevin A. Lynch, urban planner
David Mamet, playwright (Glengarry Glen Ross), author, and screenwriter (The Verdict, Wag the Dog).
Robert McCormick Adams Jr., American anthropologist and secretary of the Smithsonian Institution.
Joan Mitchell, artist best known for her painting in the abstract expressionism movement.
Alicia Patterson, editor and publisher
Elise Paschen, poet
Edith Pattou, author
Alan Pierson, conductor, co-founder of the Alarm Will Sound ensemble, Artistic Director of the Brooklyn Philharmonic
Mark Pincus, founder of social game company Zynga
 Ayanna Pressley, Democratic US congresswoman
Jay Pritzker, entrepreneur
Jennifer Pritzker, founder of the Pritzker Military Museum & Library, first and only known transgender billionaire
Barney Rosset, entrepreneur, publisher
Jeremy Sisto, actor
Brad Thor, author
Ping Tom, civic leader
Carleton Washburne, educator and author
Jacob Weisberg, journalist and editor of Slate.
Joe Weisberg, creator of The Americans
Jordan Weisman, founder of FASA Corporation & WizKids
Haskell Wexler, cinematographer (Who's Afraid of Virginia Woolf?, for).
Jim White, defensive end in the National Football League and Canadian Football League
Hillary Wolf,  actress & two-time U.S Olympian in judo
Billy Zane, actor
Lisa Zane, actress, vocalist

References

External links
Official Site

Private elementary schools in Chicago
Private middle schools in Chicago
Educational institutions established in 1901
Independent School League
Private high schools in Chicago
1901 establishments in Illinois
¥